Aditya Kaushik (born 10 September 1991) is an Indian cricketer. He plays Twenty20 cricket for Delhi. He made his List A debut on 25 September 2019, for Goa in the 2019–20 Vijay Hazare Trophy. He made his first-class debut on 9 December 2019, for Goa in the 2019–20 Ranji Trophy.

See also
 List of Delhi cricketers

References

External links
 

1991 births
Living people
Indian cricketers
Delhi cricketers
Goa cricketers
Cricketers from Delhi